Atcham is a civil parish in Shropshire, England.  It contains 67 listed buildings that are recorded in the National Heritage List for England.  Of these, four are listed at Grade I, the highest of the three grades, six at Grade II*, the middle grade, and the others are at Grade II, the lowest grade.  The parish contains the village of Atcham and the surrounding countryside.  In the parish are three country houses; each of these is listed at Grade I, and they are associated with a number of other listed buildings in the surrounding grounds.  The other Grade I listed building is the parish church, and items in the churchyard are also listed.  The Severn River runs through the parish and the older bridge crossing it is listed.  Also listed is a bridge crossing a disused branch of the Shropshire Union Canal.  The other listed buildings include houses and cottages in the village and countryside, farmhouses and farm buildings, two milestones, and a telephone kiosk.


Key

Buildings

References

Citations

Sources

Lists of buildings and structures in Shropshire